Borders of Norway may refer to:
 The Norway-Finland border
 The Norway-Russia border
 The Norway-Sweden border